Cassard was a  74-gun ship of the line of the French Navy. She was renamed Dix-août in 1798, in honour of the events of 10 August 1792, and subsequently Brave in 1803.

Career 

On 10 February 1801 Dix-août captured the 16-gun cutter , which she scuttled. On 27 March 1801, as Dix-août sailed with the fleet of Toulon, she collided with Formidable and had to return to harbour.

On 26 September 1805 Indivisible and Dix-Août succeeded in shooting away Swiftsures yards and masts, crippling her and so capturing her. Swiftsure had two men killed, two men mortally wounded, and another six wounded; the French lost 33 killed and wounded. See main article Action of 24 June 1801.

On 4 February 1803, her name was changed to Brave.

She foundered shortly thereafter on 12 April 1806 without loss of life while en route to Britain.

References

External links
 

Ships of the line of the French Navy
Téméraire-class ships of the line
1795 ships
Ships built in France
Maritime incidents in 1806
Shipwrecks in the Atlantic Ocean